Michael St John Whitehead Burton (born 14 February 1944) is a Zimbabwean former first-class cricketer.

Burton was born in February 1944 at Bulawayo, in what was then a part of Southern Rhodesia. He was educated at Umtali Boys' High School. Burton was selected to represent a South African Schools XI in cricket, before gaining first-class experience with Eastern Province. He debuted for Eastern Province against the touring Marylebone Cricket Club at Port Elizabeth in 1964. He played first-class cricket intermittently for Eastern Province until November 1967, making five appearances. He took 7 wickets for Eastern Province with his off break bowling, in addition to scoring 102 runs.

Burton went up to Mansfield College at the University of Oxford as a Rhodes Scholar in 1968. While studying at Oxford, he played first-class cricket for Oxford University, making his varsity debut against Lancashire at Oxford in 1969. He played first-class cricket for Oxford until 1971, making 31 appearances. Burton took 70 wickets for Oxford at an average of 40.24. He took a five wicket haul on two occasions, with best figures of 5 for 96, which came against Nottinghamshire in 1970. As a batsman, he scored 719 runs at a batting average of 15.63 and with a high score of 84. In addition to playing first-class cricket for Oxford, Burton also appeared in a single match for a combined Oxford and Cambridge Universities team against the touring West Indians in 1969. He captained Oxford in 1969–70, the first Rhodes Scholar to do so.

References

External links

1944 births
Living people
People from Bulawayo
Zimbabwean cricketers
Eastern Province cricketers
Zimbabwean Rhodes Scholars
Alumni of Mansfield College, Oxford
Oxford University cricketers
Oxford and Cambridge Universities cricketers